Blush: The Search For the Next Great Makeup Artist was an American reality television show on Lifetime. The show was hosted by actress Vanessa Marcil, best known for her Emmy Award-winning role as Brenda Barrett on  General Hospital.

Synopsis
Nine aspiring makeup artists tried to outdo one another for a one-year contract as a professional with Max Factor, $100,000 in cash, and a chance to show off their skills in a major glossy magazine cover shoot. The series premiered on November 11, 2008 and continued to air Tuesdays at 10:00 PM.

Mentors and judges
Charlie Green - professional makeup artist
Hal Rubenstein - fashion director of InStyle magazine
Joanna Schlip - professional makeup artist
Dannii Minogue - Australian international singer - guest judge

Contestants

Winner
Nolan Makaawaawa

Eliminated
Maxi (eliminated Episode 6)
Todd Homme (eliminated Episode 6)
Farah Carter (eliminated Episode 5)
Maura "Mo" Lewitts (eliminated Episode 4)
Myke Michaels (eliminated Episode 3)
Sharzad Kiadeh (eliminated Episode 3)
Rainell Chivonne (eliminated Episode 2)
Jessica Millington (eliminated Episode 1)

Homme's death
On December 13, 2008, contestant Todd Homme was found dead in his home in New York City. Toxicology reports came back negative and cause of death was undetermined. He was twenty-three years old.

Elimination Chart

 Green indicates the artist won the competition.
 Pink indicates the artist was the runner-up.
 Blue indicates the artist won the Max challenge and received immunity from elimination.
 Purple indicates the artist won the elimination challenge and was safe at elimination.
 White indicates the artist was safe at elimination.
 Yellow indicates the artist was in the bottom three, but declared safe at elimination.
 Orange indicates the artist was in the bottom two, but declared safe at elimination.
 Red indicates the artist was eliminated.
Sharzad was eliminated at an impromptu elimination challenge in place of the Max challenge.
Nolan won the Max challenge in week 5, but did not receive immunity and was in the bottom 2 at elimination.

References

External links
 Official website at Mylifetime.com
 

2008 American television series debuts
2000s American reality television series
2008 American television series endings
Lifetime (TV network) original programming
Cosmetic industry